Doru Tureanu (11 January 1954 – 11 March 2014) was a Romanian ice hockey player.

Career
Tureanu spent his entire career in his hometown, playing for Dinamo Bucuresti in the Romanian Hockey League from 1970 to 1987. With his team, he won the national championship six times, in 1971, 1972, 1973, 1976, 1979 and 1981. Both with Dinamo and the Romanian national team, he played on a forward line with Marian Costea and Dumitru Axinte.

In 2011, he became the second Romanian player to be inducted into the IIHF Hall of Fame.

For the Romanian national team, he participated in the Group A World Championships in 1977, the Group B World Championships in 1972, 1973, 1974, 1975, 1976, 1978, 1979, 1981, 1982, and 1983, and the Group C World Championships in 1971, 1985, 1986 and 1987. He played for Romania at the 1984 Thayer Tutt Trophy, which has held for nations that didn't qualify for the Olympics that year. In addition, he participated at the 1976 Winter Olympics in Innsbruck, and the 1980 Winter Olympics in Lake Placid.

At the 1976 Olympics, Tureanu scored 6 goals, and added 6 assists, in only six games. At the 1980 Olympics, he scored 5 goals and added 2 assists in five games, including a hat trick against West Germany.

Tureanu died at Colentina Hospital in Bucharest on March 11, 2014 at the age of 60.

Career statistics

International

References

External links 
Doru Tureanu at hhof.com

1954 births
2014 deaths
Ice hockey players at the 1976 Winter Olympics
Ice hockey players at the 1980 Winter Olympics
IIHF Hall of Fame inductees
Olympic ice hockey players of Romania
Romanian ice hockey centres
Sportspeople from Bucharest